Peter J. Notaro (February 21, 1935 – June 17, 2014) was an American jurist.

Born in Buffalo, New York, Notaro received his bachelor's degree from University at Buffalo, The State University of New York and then his law degree from University at Buffalo Law School. He practiced law and then served as assistant district attorney for Erie County, New York. In 1975, Notaro was elected to the Erie County Family Court and in 1992, was elected to the New York Supreme Court. He retired in 2005. He died in Buffalo, New York.

Notes

1935 births
2014 deaths
Lawyers from Buffalo, New York
University at Buffalo alumni
University at Buffalo Law School alumni
New York Supreme Court Justices
20th-century American judges
20th-century American lawyers